Coleophora sodae is a moth of the family Coleophoridae. It is found in Spain, Portugal and France.

The larvae feed on Salsola soda. They feed on the generative organs of their host plant.

References

sodae
Moths of Europe
Moths described in 1993